Antonida Asonova (born 24 August 1979) is a Kazakhstani ice hockey player. She competed in the women's tournament at the 2002 Winter Olympics.

References

1979 births
Living people
Kazakhstani women's ice hockey defencemen
Olympic ice hockey players of Kazakhstan
Ice hockey players at the 2002 Winter Olympics
Sportspeople from Almaty